This is a list of French football transfers for the 2012 summer transfer window. The summer transfer window opened on 13 June 2012 and closed at midnight on 4 September 2012. Only moves involving Ligue 1 and Ligue 2 clubs are listed. Players without a club may join one at any time, either during or in between transfer windows.

Transfers

 Player who signs with a club before the transfer window opens in June 2012 can officially join his new club on 1 July 2012, while a player who joins after the open of the transfer window will join his new club following his signature of the contract.

References

French
Transfers Summer 2012
2012